Grigory Alexandrovich Gukovsky (1 May 1902, in Saint Petersburg – 2 April 1950, in Moscow) was a Russian Formalist literary historian and scholar whose work at the Pushkin House led to the rediscovery of 18th-century Russian literature.

He graduated from the Petrograd University in 1923 and held the chair in Russian literature there. Gukovsky was considered the foremost authority on 18th-century Russian literature. After spending a winter in besieged Leningrad he read lectures in Saratov University until 1948. Upon his return to Leningrad Gukovsky was arrested as a "rootless cosmopolitan". He died of a heart attack in Lefortovo Prison.

Gukovsky's wife Natalia Rykova (1898–1928) was Anna Akhmatova's close friend. She died in childbirth. Their daughter Natalia Dolinina (1928–1979) wrote a number of books for children. Gukovsky's disciples include Juri Lotman.

References 

Russian literary historians
Russian literary critics
Russian formalism
Saint Petersburg State University alumni
Academic staff of Saint Petersburg State University
Prisoners who died in Russian detention
1902 births
1950 deaths
Soviet literary historians
Soviet male writers
20th-century Russian male writers
Inmates of Lefortovo Prison